Although the Hungarian language is currently widely acknowledged scientifically and by the Hungarian Academy of Sciences as a member of the Uralic language family, there is a history of other theories from before and after the Uralic connection was established, as well as some fringe theories that continue to deny the connection.

Rationale

Opponents of the Finno-Ugric theory put forward alternative theories in response to two principal problems:
 According to one view, the relations between languages cannot be identified with ethnological history. The original Uralic and Finno-Ugric homelands are only the places of origin of the languages; however, within the framework of the Finno-Ugric theory, a Uralic origin of the Hungarians as an ethnic (as opposed to linguistic) group is also asserted. According to the alternative theories, the vast majority of the constituent Hungarian ethnicities have no Uralic connection whatsoever—genetically, archaeologically or linguistically. Therefore, the development of the Finno-Ugric language family can only be explained by language exchange, overlaying, or a transit language.
 The second main argument is that, although Hungarian does have similarities in structure and vocabulary with Finno-Ugric languages, it has equally significant and fundamental similarities to other language groups, such as the Turkic languages. The alternative theories claim that the connections between Finno-Ugric languages do not pre-date these other relationships, or even that Finno-Ugric peoples took up a linguistic stratum from the Hungarians into their own languages. It is on this basis that these languages are now classified as Finno-Ugric.

Alternative theories 
Ármin Vámbéry was a Hungarian traveler, orientalist, and Turkologist. He was the first to put forward a significant alternative origin theory. Vámbéry's first large linguistic work, entitled "Magyar és török-tatár nyelvekbeli szóegyezések" and published in 1869–70, was the casus belli of the "Ugric-Turk War" (Ugor-török háború), which started as a scientific dispute, but quickly turned into a bitter feud lasting for two decades. In this work Vámbéry tried to demonstrate, with the help of word comparisons, that as a result of intermingling of the early Hungarians with Turkic peoples, the Hungarian language gained a distinct dual character as Ugric AND Turkic albeit it is basically Ugric in origin, so he presented a variant of linguistic contact theory.
"…the Hungarian language is Ugric in its origin, but because the nations later contact and historical transformation it is equally Ugric and Turkic in character…"
("…a magyar nyelv eredetében ugor, de a nemzet későbbi érintkezése és történeti átalakulásánál fogva egyformán ugor és török jellemű…") (Vámbéry 1869: 120).

The "Ugric–Turkic War"
"The fight, which my fanatical opponents, regrettably, brought over also to the field of personal remarks, lasted quite a long time, but the old Latin proverb was proven once again: Philologi certant, tamen sub judice lis."
("A küzdelem, melyet fanatikus ellenfeleim, sajnos, átvittek a személyeskedés terére is, eltartott jó sokáig, de ezúttal is bevált a régi diák közmondás: Philologi certant, tamen sub judice lis.")

Vámbéry's work was criticized by Finno-Ugrist  in "Jelentés Vámbéry Ármin magyar-török szóegyezéséről", published in 1871. Budenz criticised Vámbéry and his work in an aggressive, derogatory style, and questioned Vámbéry's (scientific) honesty and credibility. (Budenz's work was investigated and analysed by a group of modern linguists, and they found it neither as scientific nor as conclusive in the question of the affiliation of Hungarian language, as the author stated.)
The historian Henrik Marczali, linguist Károly Pozder, linguist József Thúry, anthropologist Aurél Török, and  many other scientist supported Vámbéry.

The Finno-Ugrist  widened the front of the "Ugric-Turk War" with his book "Magyarország ethnographiája.", published in 1876. In this book he stresses the very strong connection between language and nation (p. 48.), tries to prove that the Huns were Finno-Ugric (p. 122.), questions the credibility and origin of the Gestas (p. 295.), concludes that the Huns, Bulgars and Avars were Ugric (p. 393.), mentions, that the Jews are more prolific than other peoples, so the quickly growing number of them presents a real menace for the nation (p. 420.), and stresses what an important and eminent role the Germans played in the development of Hungarian culture and economy (p. 424.).

In his work titled "Vámbéry Ármin: A magyarok eredete. Ethnologiai tanulmány.", and published in 1882, Vámbéry went a step further, and presented a newer version of his theory, in which he claimed that Hungarian nation and language are basically Turkic in origin, and the Finno-Ugric element in them is a result of later contact and intermingling.

"...I see a compound people in Hungarians, in which not the Finno-Ugric, but the Turkic-Tatar component gives the true core..."

"...a magyarban vegyülék népet látok, a melyben nem finn-ugor, hanem török-tatár elem képezi a tulajdonképeni magvat..." in: Vámbéry Ármin: A magyarok eredete. Ethnologiai tanulmány. Preface. p. VI.

Vámbéry's work was criticized heavily by his Finno-Ugrist opponents. This critique gave rise to the ever-circling myth of the "fish-smelling kinship" and its variants. No one of the authors has ever given the written source/base of this accusation against the Turanist scientists. In fact, Turanist scientists did not write such things about the Finno-Ugric peoples, and Vámbéry and his followers mentioned these kin of Hungarians with due respect. In reality it was coined by the Finno-Ugrist Ferdinánd Barna, in his work "Vámbéry Ármin A magyarok eredete czímű műve néhány főbb állításának bírálata." ("Critique of some main statements of Ármin Vámbéry's work, titled 'The origin of Hungarians'.") published in 1884. In this work Barna called the Finno-Ugric peoples "a petty, fish fat eating people spending their woeful lives with fish- and easel-catching", and tried to give this colorful description of his into Vámbéry's mouth.

Vámbéry held to his scientific theory about the mixed origin of Hungarian language and people until his death. He considered Hungarian a contact language, more precisely a mixed language, having not just one but two (Finno-Ugric AND Turkic) genetic ancestors. His strongest evidences were the large corpus of ancient Turkish words in Hungarian word-stock (300-400 for a minimum, and even more with good alternative Turkic etymologies), and the strong typological similarity of Hungarian and Turkic languages. His Finno-Ugrist opponents strongly rejected not only the fact of such mixing and dual ancestry, but even the theoretical possibility of it. Some scientists questioned seriously even the existence of Uralic as valid language family, and attention turned towards the complex areal relations and interactions of Eurasian languages (Uralic and Altaic languages included). In the light of these developments linguists have started to pay due credit to Vámbéry and his work.

In connection with Vámbéry's work and the ensuing Ugric-Turkic War it is worth recalling the thoughts of linguist Maarten Mous:
"Mixed languages pose a challenge to historical linguistics because these languages defy classification. One attitude towards mixed languages has been that they simply do not exist, and that the claims for mixed languages are instances of a naive use of the term. The inhibition to accept the existence of mixed languages is linked to the fact that it was inconceivable how they could emerge, and moreover their mere existence posited a threat to the validity of the comparative method and to genetic linguistics."

Regardless of faction, both alternative theories debate the direction of linguistic "borrowing," and the model of language evolution. According to alternative theories, the Ugric language family (or the Finno-Ugric or Uralic-Altaic) received common word sets with the help of a traffic language, and the base of this traffic language would have been Hungarian. The alternative theories claim that the important language characteristics the Finno-Ugric theory relies upon only developed much later. The diminutives are one of several such cases. The Uralic and Finnish languages have simple diminutives (-csa/i and -ka/e/i), but both variants can be found in the Hungarian language. However, the Slavic diminutive -ca, and even traces of the diminutives of other languages, like –d and –ny, are also present.

Several different attributes of the Hungarian language can be connected with other languages as well.

Kabardian-Hungarian 
Linguist Gábor Bálint de Szentkatolna was the first to systematize and represent this the theory of a Kabardian-Hungarian language group. While on his travels to the Caucasus, Szentkatolna noticed that Hungarian appeared to be related to Kabardian. In his book A honfoglalás revíziója ("Revision of the Conquest"), the linguist tries to prove the relation not only from lingual side, but form historical and cultural aspects as well. According to his theory, the Huns did not fully merge with the other nomadic people migrating to Europe, with some of them staying in the Caucasus region, and others returning to the Carpathian Basin. According to his theories, the Huns had two descendant, the Khazars and the Avars. He did not consider the Kabardians—who live in the Caucasus—aboriginals, rather he considered them the direct descendants of the Khazars. He classified both languages as part of the Turanian language family (what is roughly the same as the Uralic-Altaic language family theory today), but considered them unique languages, that did not belong to the Turk language group. He did not exclude the Ugric impact, as he was of the opinion that the tribe of the Sabir people who joined Hungarians—mentioned by Purple-born Constantine (szabartoiaszfaloi)—is such a tribe. The most major error in his theory is that he handled Kabardian as a fully isolated language, claiming that it changed very little, ignoring the local linguistic evolution. His work was forgotten after the language war, and the theory was never debated. The last person who engaged with the theory was Pál Sándor in 1903. Sándor issued his writings with the title Magyar és a kabard nyelv viszonya ("Hungarian and Kabardian languages' relation").

Tamana-research 
Studies the similarities and concords of geographical names found in the Carpathian Basin and all over the world.

Yeniseian 
Based on lexical similarities between Hungarian and the Yeniseian languages, it has been argued by Jingyi Gao that the Hungarian language has a Hunnic substratum. The Hunnic language has been theorized to be of Yeniseian origin by some linguists being closely related to Pumpokol and Arin. This theory was picked up by Jingyi Gao who argued that lexical evidence shows that Hungarian has multiple loanwords from the Yeniseian Hunnic language. The following correspondences have been proposed:

Hungarian-Sumerian hypothesis 

A hypothesis exists in Hungarian and international historiography that relates the Sumerians to the Hungarians. According to it, the Sumerian and Hungarian languages would be related and the ancestors of both peoples would have had contact in the past and share a common origin. This leaves a huge temporal gap and suggests a very extensive origin for the speakers of Uralic languages (as their Urheimat is generally believed to be at the west of the Ural Mountains). Most of its supporters deny a direct linguistic relationship between Hungarian and the other Finno-Ugric languages.

The hypothesis had more popularity among Sumerologists in the 19th and early 20th centuries. Nowadays, it is mostly dismissed, although it is acknowledged that Sumerian is an agglutinative language, just like the Hungarian, Turkish and Finnish languages and regarding linguistic structure resembles these and some Caucasian languages; however in  vocabulary,  grammar,  and  syntax Sumerian  still  stands  alone  and  seems  to be  unrelated  to  any  other  language,  living  or  dead.

Etruscan-Hungarian 
Another theory that received attention was the Etruscan-Hungarian theory, based on the research of Italian linguist Mario Alinei. Rather speaking about an Etruscan-Hungarian language relation, Alinei claims that Etruscan belongs to the Aryan family, and concludes that its closest relative is Hungarian. Alinei's proposal has been rejected by Etruscan experts such as Giulio M. Facchetti, Finno-Ugric experts such as Angela Marcantonio, and by Hungarian historical linguists such as Bela Brogyanyi.

Hungarian root theory 

The root theory is a system of internal reconstruction of Hungarian, and proposes an analysis similar to the triconsonantal roots found in the Semitic languages but based on mainly on pairs of two consonants.

The system was first proposed by Gergely Czuczor and János Fogarasi in their six-volume dictionary of Hungarian, published between 1861 and 1874. The integrated word bush system runs through the language organically. Later supporters of the root theory claim that official Hungarian linguistics denies this simple fact, ignores the method of inner reconstruction and ignores the Czuczor-Fogarasi dictionary. The methodology, however, is considered unscientific by a wide range of academics.

The fragments of these bush systems are further alleged to be found also in other languages in partly or in ruins, but none of them as whole as in Hungarian. Loan words, taken from other languages either took root, and were pulled into the same meaning-circle as the corresponding root, were only used in a specific field, or were spilled out from the language. These bush systems—as the result of loaning larger amounts of words, and the fading meaning of the word roots, are broken in the majority of the languages. Because of the logical buildup of the word bushes (self-similarity, natural forms), the Hungarian language either developed together with an artificial language, or–respecting the iconic pictures, hiding in the roots–it developed as human mind advanced. According to this theory, the clearest form of ancient language was preserved in the language that we call Hungarian today. They assume that ancient Hungarians were the transmitters, rather than the receivers, of this knowledge and its words, or they least adopted it extremely successfully. Therefore, this theory requires proto-Hungarians to have lived in and around the Carpathian Basin longer than is normally accepted.

The root theory has almost since its introduction been criticized for its incompatibility with most other research on Hungarian etymology, particularly with loanword studies, in proposing root etymologies even for relatively recent loanwords acquired from the Slavic, Romance and Germanic languages.

Critics of the root theory point that the theory is not scientifically provable. Critics claim that the root system is not a special, new, or newly founded linguistic attribute, but a "linguistic constant", what can be found in almost every language. Continuing, critics point out that it is impossible to not exclude the possibility of the import of the root system, because the Hungarian language does have root composing trends, but in an even more ancient form.

Criticism of the alternative theories

Criticism from the national identity 
According some critics, such as Károly Rédei fe., the alternative theories feast on the "utopian national identity." Official linguistics uses the term "utopian linguist" for scientists denying the Finno-Ugric relation of the Hungarian language. Rédei claims that the introduction of Hungarian's Finno-Ugric origin was met with disapproval because of the theory's  clear anti-national message and political purpose.

Difficulties in using certain theories 
According to the Finno-Ugric theory, the words relatable with Finno-Ugric languages are more basic, belong to a more primitive meaning circle, than the words stemming from Turkic languages. The mere 500 Finno-Ugric words from the Hungarian language can only form a fragment of a basic word set, and the majority lend themselves to a Turkic, Indo-European or other non-Finno-Ugric origin.

See also 
 Cal-Ugrian theory

References

Further information 
 Finnugrisztikai alapismeretek (ELTE)
 Badiny-Jós Ferenc: Egyedül maradtam... Mégis féltek tőlem...?
 Dr. Bakay Kornél: Őstörténetünk és nyelvünk erőszakos finnesítése ellen I-II.
 Bobula Ida írások (sumer rokonság)
 A finnugor nyelvrokonság kutatástörténete
 EKOSZ-EMTE: Művelődés 33 – Gondolatok a magyarkultúráról
 Kiszely István: A magyarok őstörténete: a magyar nyelv eredete (török rokonság)
 Dr. Marácz László: A finnugor elmélet tarthatatlansága nyelvészeti szempontból (A finnugor elmélet elvetése mellett érvelő nyelvészeti tanulmány.)
 Dr. Marácz László: A kétszer kaksi igazsága (válasz Rédei Károlynak)
 Mancs.hu: Ősvita  (a magyar nyelv rokonítási kísérleteiről)
 Ősnyelv (gondolatok az ősnyelvről, benne a magyarról)
 Mit mondanak nyelvünkről a külföldiek? (A magyar nyelv eredetéről)
 Nyelvrokonságok táblája (magyar-altaji-finnugor-dravida-szumér-etruszk rokonság)
 Varga Csaba (ősnyelvpárti)
 Varga Csaba: Az angol szókincs magyar szemmel, 2007
 Varga Csaba: Ógörög:Régies csángó nyelv, 2006
 Pacaldiéta  (A nyelvrokonságról)
 Honti László (főszerkesztő): A nyelvrokonságról Az török, sumer és egyéb áfium ellen való orvosság, Budapest, Tinta Könyvkiadó, 2010.
 Honti László: Anyanyelvünk atyafiságáról és a nyelvrokonság ismérveiről Tények és vágyak, Budapest, Tinta Könyvkiadó, 2012.
 Borbola János (2008): A kota és a ház. Ősi gyökér 36 (2): 2–18.
 Buji Ferenc (kiadatlan): A botlás köve, avagy a p- > f- hangátalakulás.
 Buji Ferenc (1996): A kány-szócsalád. Magyar Szemle (Budapest) 7–8: 732–745. (első rész), illetve Magyar Szemle (Budapest) 9: 900–916. (második rész).
 Buji Ferenc (2000): Ismeretlen eredetű szavaink. Életünk (Szombathely) 6: 545–554.)
 Gostony, C-G. (1975): Dictionnaire d'etymologie sumérienne et grammaire comparée. Paris.
 Gosztonyi Kálmán (1977): Összehasonlító szumér nyelvtan. Fahrwangen. (Az előbbi, pontosabban csak a nyelvtani rész, magyar nyelvű kiadása. Fordította Vállay Frigyes Károly.)
 Sára Péter (1999): Ősi szavaink nyomában iráni és turáni tájakon. Közös gyökerű szavaink. Budapest. 
 Timaru-Karst Sándor (1999): Kelta magyarok, magyar kelták. Budapest. 

Hungarian language
Fringe theories